Steve Carter (born 22 July 1970) is an Australian former professional rugby league footballer who played in the 1980s, 1990s and 2000s. A New South Wales State of Origin representative , in Australia he played for and captained the Penrith Panthers, with whom he won the 1991 NSWRL Premiership. He ended his career with a season in England with the Widnes Vikings.

Club career
While attending Jamieson High School, Carter played for the 1987 Australian Schoolboys.

A Wyong junior, Carter was graded by the Panthers in 1988. He primarily played in the  position. Carter was on the interchange bench for the Panthers first and unsuccessful Grand Final attempt in season 1990. He was the regular five-eighth in the 1991 Panthers outfit that clinched the club's first premiership. Following the grand final victory he travelled with the Panthers to England for the 1991 World Club Challenge which was lost to Wigan.

After the turmoil at the club which upset the 1992 season and saw a number of senior players leave, Carter took over as captain, a role he maintained throughout the 1990s. In spite of career threatening injuries and poor form he played out the 2001 series in a successful attempt to beat Royce Simmons' record of club appearances for the Panthers. Carter holds the standing club record of 242 first grade appearances.

After fourteen seasons with the Panthers, Carter spent one season (2002) in the Super League with the Widnes Vikings.

Representative career
Carter enjoyed one year of representative football - in 1992 he was selected for Country Origin, and made one appearance off the interchange bench for New South Wales in Game II of the 1992 State of Origin series.

Career highlights
 First Grade Debut: 1988 - Round 13 Penrith vs Illawarra Steelers at Penrith Stadium, 13 June
 State of Origin: 1992 - Game 2, New South Wales vs Queensland at Lang Park, 20 May
 Premierships: 1991 - Member of the Penrith Panthers Grand Final winning team

Footnotes

References

External links

1970 births
Living people
Australian rugby league players
Penrith Panthers players
Penrith Panthers captains
Widnes Vikings players
Country New South Wales Origin rugby league team players
New South Wales Rugby League State of Origin players
Rugby league five-eighths